Octatetraynyl radical is an organic free radical with eight carbon atoms linked in a linear chain with alternating single bonds and triple bonds.

In 2007 negatively charged octatetraynyl was detected in Galactic molecular source TMC-1, making it the second type of anion to be found in the interstellar medium (after hexatriynyl radical) and the largest such molecule detected to date.

References

Alkynes
Free radicals